Sept Frères may refer to:

 Sept-Frères, a commune in France
 Seven Brothers (islands), also known as Les Sept Frères, located in Djibouti